Balkrishan Ganpatrao Matapurkar is an Indian medical researcher and multi-lingual poet. He first defined the term "organ regeneration" and was awarded a US patent on adult stem cells used for organ regeneration.

Works

References 

Medical doctors from Madhya Pradesh
Living people
1941 births
People from Gwalior